The 1963 New Zealand Labour Party leadership election was held on 26 February to choose the sixth leader of the New Zealand Labour Party. The election was won by Island Bay MP Arnold Nordmeyer.

This is the first time that a new leader had been elected which wasn't triggered by the death of the previous leader.

Background 
Leader Walter Nash had led Labour since 1951 and after his government's defeat in 1960 he defied expectations by not announcing his intention to retire from the leadership. Pressure within the Labour Party membership built up for a leadership change, though Nash was reluctant to stand down and was determined not be succeeded by Nordmeyer. His preferred successor, Jerry Skinner, died in April 1962 though Nash decided still to remain leader for the 1963 election with Fred Hackett elected as his new deputy. However, in December 1962 party president Martyn Finlay (who had a strained relationship with Nash) wrote a letter to the caucus recommending a change in leadership, though was careful enough not to specifically suggest a successor. Following this, Nash finally announced his resignation and Hackett was known to be terminally ill. Both of Nash's deputy leaders were unable to succeed him and other potential leadership contenders Michael Moohan, Norman Kirk and Hugh Watt ruled themselves out.

Candidates

Arnold Nordmeyer 
Arnold Nordmeyer had been a contender for the leadership for many years prior. By 1963 his only convincing rival, Jerry Skinner, had died in April 1962 and Fred Hackett, another contender, had died in March 1963.

Result
As Nordmeyer was the only officially nominated candidate, he was universally elected as leader. Nash remained leader until 31 March and Nordmeyer took over his roles as party leader and Leader of the Opposition.

Deputy-leadership ballot

Aftermath 
Nordmeyer would remain the Labour Party's leader until 1965 when he was ousted as leader by Norman Kirk. He led Labour to an election loss in 1963 where Labour's vote did increase though only equated to one extra seat. Deputy leader Hugh Watt remained in his position despite the leadership change.

Notes

References

Labour Party leadership
1963
New Zealand Labour Party leadership election
February 1963 events in New Zealand